The Jaynagar–Janakpur–Bardibas railway line (Hindi/ Nepali: जयनगर–जनकपुर–बर्दीबास रेलवे) is a cross-border railway line in India. The railway links Kurtha with Jaynagar, crossing the India–Nepal border at Inarwa. An extension to Bardibas is under way. It is the only operational railway line in Nepal.

Sections
The railway line is splitting into three sections spanning total 68.7 km of distance.

Jaynagar–Kurtha section
The Jaynagar–Kurtha section built under the government of India's grant assistance of NPR 8.77 billion. The section is 35 km. long and it has 7 stations from Jaynagar to Kurtha. The Jaynagar railway station is the first station that is inside India. After 3 km of distance from the Jaynagar railway station, the international border is located. After some distance from the border, the first railway station inside Nepal comes on this railway line. Inarwa railway station is the first railway station on this section.

There are 5 stations between Jaynagar to Kurtha:
Jaynagar (India)
Inarwa
Khajuri (Halt)
Baidehi
Parbaha
Janakpurdham
Kurtha

Kurtha–Bijalpura section
Kurtha–Bijalpura section is a 17 km long railway line which has been already completed.

Stations between Kurtha to Bijalpura:
Kurtha
Khutta Pipradhi
Loharpatti
Singyahi
Bhangaha
Bijalpura

Bijalpura–Bardibas section
The work on Bijalpura–Bardibas section has not yet started. The land acquisition for the project is not yet completed. New line will be constructed till Bardibas after Government of Nepal hands over the land for the project.

History 

Second railway line in Nepal as narrow gauge  was built in 1937. The line was Named Nepal Janakpur Jaynagar Railway (NJJR). It was built by Britishers to carry timber from the then heavily forested areas of Janakpur in the Kingdom of Nepal to Jainagar (India).
 When all the timber in the area cut, the station was opened for the passenger.
 Janakpur is a pilgrimage site for Hindus so people from India started to visit Janakpur by this train and Nepalese villagers find this train to go India in the search of Job. The train service on this line stopped in 2014 to convert it into broad gauge.

The Broad gauge  railway project was started in 2014 when Nepali Congress senior leader and former Deputy Prime minister Bimalendra Nidhi was Minister for Physical Infrastructure and Transport in Sushil Koirala cabinet.

Re operation, 2022 

The test operation has completed, and officially inaugurated by Nepali Prime Minister Sher Bahadur Deuba and Indian Prime Minister Narendra Modi on 2 April 2022. It was fully operational for passenger service on 3 April 2022. As per General Manager of Nepal Railways Niranjan Jha, 1350 passengers can travel by train at one time.

See also 
 Railway stations in Nepal
 Nepal railway
 Indian Railways
 Railway stations in India

References 

International railway lines in Asia
5 ft 6 in gauge railways in India
Rail transport in Nepal
Transport in Jainagar